Orient Fever (German:Orientfieber) is a 1923 German silent film directed by Edmund Linke and starring Bernd Aldor, Friedrich Kühne and Otti Ottera.

Cast
 Bernd Aldor as Reginald Astor  
 Friedrich Kühne 
 Otti Ottera as Liane, Reginalds Favoritin

References

External links

1923 films
Films of the Weimar Republic
German silent feature films
German black-and-white films